Yorkdale Shopping Centre, Yorkdale Mall, or simply Yorkdale, is a major retail shopping centre in Toronto, Ontario, Canada. Located at the intersection of Highway 401 and Allen Road, it opened in 1964 as the largest enclosed shopping mall in the world. Yorkdale is currently the third largest shopping mall in Canada by floor space and has the highest sales per unit area of any mall in Canada, with current merchandise sales levels at roughly /square foot. At 18 million annual visitors, it is one of the country's busiest malls. Many international retailers have opened their first Canadian locations at Yorkdale.

Yorkdale is currently owned by a joint venture between the Ontario Municipal Employees Retirement System through its subsidiary Oxford Properties Group and the Alberta Investment Management Corporation.

History

Construction and design

In the 1950s, the department store chain T. Eaton & Co. bought a  site at Dufferin Street and Highway 401 for a new massive, suburban location. In 1958, rival department store chain Simpson's purchased a  site to the east and the plan to build the complex was announced that year. Design of the mall was given to the Seattle firm of John Graham Consultants, except for the Simpson's store, designed by John Andrews of John B. Parkin Associates. Howard Lesser was the planning and development consultant. Using Lesser's market research, the developers determined how much floor space to give up to each category of retailer, and chose retailers who would appeal to a broad range of shoppers.

The mall opened on February 26, 1964, under the ownership of the Trizec Corporation. It was one of the largest shopping centres in the world. The mall had the shape of the letter L and was bordered in its extremities by Simpsons and Dominion, while Eaton's was at the junction of the two corridors. Yorkdale was the first major suburban mall constructed in Toronto. Located at the edge of the urbanized city, the new shopping centre was dependent on the construction of the Spadina Expressway, later renamed Allen Road, as the developers would not proceed until the freeway was approved for construction.

The mall was constructed with a novel system for its retailers to receive merchandise. While other Canadian shopping centres had their receiving doors located at the backside, Yorkdale was constructed with a one-way, two-lane road for trucks running beneath the centre that leads directly to retailers' basement storages. The corridors still retain this look and feel although renovations in 2006 replaced the ceilings, windows, floors and skylights.

Expansions and renovations

In 1984, Yorkdale expanded with 75 new stores bringing an additional 153,000 square feet to the mall. It expanded again in 1986 to reach 1.3 million square feet, having now more than doubled its number of stores from when it first opened.

In 1991, the Simpson's store was converted to a The Bay store after Hudson's Bay Company  purchased the Simpson's chain in 1978. An existing The Bay store, that had joined the mall in November 1988, was sold to Sears Canada in the process.

The Universal Man statue in the west parking lot was relocated from the base of the CN Tower to accommodate the construction of the Rogers Centre (then known as SkyDome) in 1987 and relocated to Yorkdale in 1994.

In 1999, Yorkdale completed a major overhaul, adding a Rainforest Café restaurant, a Famous Players SilverCity movie theatre (which has since been taken over by Cineplex Entertainment), and an Indigo Books and Music store on the north side of the mall, facing Highway 401.

The expansion added Old Navy, Zara, H&M, and Home Outfitters as sub-anchors. This gave Yorkdale the title of the third-largest mall in Ontario after Square One Shopping Centre in Mississauga and Toronto Eaton Centre, ahead of Scarborough Town Centre in terms of retail floor space.

The renovation project continued into 2006 and 2007. This renovation matched the earlier sections of the mall to the style of the 2005 expansion. Key elements of this project included new public washrooms, the opening of a Moxie's Grill & Bar restaurant, and new sliding automatic doors at all entrances. An advertising campaign, branded as "Change It Up!" was launched in conjunction with the renovation and redevelopment, winning a MAXI Award from the International Council of Shopping Centers (ICSC) in 2007.

Expansion continued in the second half of the decade. In April 2008, Yorkdale opened a Michael Kors store. Later additions included Armani Exchange, Crate & Barrel, BOSS, and a Tiffany & Co.

In January 2011, Yorkdale announced another expansion, adding another , sufficient for 40 store fronts, and 800 underground parking spaces. This new wing took the space of the southwest parking lot. The expansion also relocated and doubled the number of seats at the food court, improved public access, and landscaped portions of the property. The expansion, costing $35 million, was opened in the summer of 2012, and completed in November 2012. The existing food court was relocated to a new location on the third level of the former Eaton's department store. The area of the former food court was redeveloped into a new wing, which housed new stores including a Microsoft Store, DavidsTea, and a Tesla showroom, as well as a larger Apple Store. The new parking garage was built below the wing.

In 2012, Holt Renfrew expanded to the west by adding  18,925 square feet to the existing 65,047 as part of another increase of the mall.

In April 2013, Yorkdale announced a  million expansion, which would add an additional  of retail, featuring a three-level  Nordstrom store and a Uniqlo store. This project involved the closure of the Rainforest Café (at Yorkdale since 1999), as well as the demolition of the multi-level parking garage at the southeast of the complex bordering Yorkdale Road. The project began in January 2014 and the new wing opened for business in late 2016. Rainforest Café has since been replaced with an expansion of Sport Chek.

In June 2013, Sears Canada announced the closing of their store at Yorkdale. The former Sears space was renovated to house Sporting Life and RH, both of which opened on October 19, 2017. The wing also includes Uncle Tetsu's Cheesecake bakery.

The Milestones Grill and Bar restaurant, located near Hudson's Bay, was closed in 2016. It was then announced that the American restaurant chain The Cheesecake Factory would open its first Canadian location in the mall. The location was renovated and expanded to accommodate the new restaurant and it opened to the public in November 2017. As of 2019, the restaurant still experiences wait times up to three hours.

In 2017, Oxford Properties submitted an application to the City of Toronto for a block zoning plan to guide future development of the site. In the first phase, new buildings would be constructed along the Dufferin Avenue frontage, incorporating a boutique hotel, a cinema and new retail, with future phases being built on the north parking lot, to incorporate residential and office uses. In March 2019, the City launched a study on the re-development of the parking lots and other areas of the mall property to improve traffic as well as mixed-use for the site to include residential and retail use. If approved, the re-development would result in parking being moved underground. However, some residents in the neighbourhood are opposed to the development.

On June 26, 2020, the Microsoft Store closed as part of its parent's winding down of the chain. From late 2020 to 2022, Nissan Studio occupied the space that was formerly the Microsoft Store and serves as a showroom for the Japanese automaker's vehicles, not a dealership.

Incidents
Two stabbings occurred at the mall in 2008. In the first half of 2013, two shootings occurred at the mall. The first one took place in the external surface lot late on a Saturday night in March 2013, leaving one man dead and one man injured. In May 2013, a man was injured by shots fired into the Joey restaurant at midnight on a Friday night. Yorkdale upgraded its security with a new $3.4 million video surveillance system that went into service in March 2014. The new system provides full 360-degree surveillance of the mall and the parking lots. It also includes licence plate recognition technology at parking entrances. In August 2018, Yorkdale Mall was shut down after a spate of gun violence erupted at one of three Starbucks locations. Though nobody was seriously injured, it caused major delays on major TTC routes. On August 29, 2021, Yorkdale Mall went into lockdown following a shooting inside the mall. One suspect was arrested.

Retailers

Department stores and restaurants

The department stores at the mall are RH, Hudson's Bay, Nordstrom and Holt Renfrew. Junior anchors include Uniqlo, Muji, Sporting Life, and Indigo Books and Music.

Restaurants in Yorkdale outside the food court include The Cheesecake Factory, Michel's Bakery Cafe and Michel's Baguette, Moxie's Grill & Bar, Joey, Jamie's Italian, Pickle Barrel, and Uncle Tetsu's Cheesecake. In summer of 2023, Nordstrom will close permanently.

Retail mix

When first opened, Yorkdale had a large number of clothing retailers along with large department stores in the mix of stores. Yorkdale was the first Canadian mall to include two major department stores: Simpson's and Eaton's, under the same roof. Eaton's went bankrupt in 1999 and its space was redeveloped into a new wing that opened in 2005.

Since the late 1990s onward, Yorkdale's management has focused on attracting luxury brand retailers, especially those selling clothing and accessories, as well as high-end electronics, a strategy also adopted by Sherway Gardens. These include Versace, Bulgari, Burberry, Cartier, Chanel, Gucci, Prada, Kate Spade, Tory Burch, Moncler, Jimmy Choo, Apple, and Bose. Yorkdale has also attracted American and international retailers seeking to expand to Canada. Yorkdale bought out the lease of Sears in 2014 to reallocate that space for higher-priced department stores.

Unlike other major malls in Toronto, such as Toronto Eaton Centre, Scarborough Town Centre, Sherway Gardens, and Fairview Mall, Yorkdale does not have grocery stores or discount store tenants, though before the late 1990s, Yorkdale had a Dominion grocery store and an LCBO. However, Yorkdale has a Shoppers Drug Mart. In the vicinity of Yorkdale, there are factory outlets and discount stores nearby on Orfus Road, while big box stores are located on Dufferin Street just north of Highway 401. Lawrence Allen Centre, formerly Lawrence Square Shopping Centre, to the south on Lawrence Avenue at Allen Road, serves the local community.

Yorkdale places a requirement on each tenant to renovate regularly. When each tenant renews its lease with the mall, they are required to renovate their store.

Canadian firsts
Yorkdale has been the point of entry into the Canadian market for many widely known international commercial enterprises. Companies that have opened or plan on opening their first Canadian store at Yorkdale include:

 Apple Store — May 2005, relocated to new wing in December 2012.
 Bath & Body Works — September 2008
 Crate & Barrel — Late 2008
 Furla — October 2019
 GEOX — May 2005
 J.Crew — August 2011
 Kate Spade New York — November 2012
 LOFT — November 2012
 Microsoft Store — November 2012
 Ted Baker — November 2012
 Tesla Motors — November 2012
 True Religion — October 2010
 Zara Home — August 2013
 John Varvatos — November 2013
 Christian Louboutin — November 2013
 David Yurman — Winter 2013
 AllSaints — April 2013
 Salvatore Ferragamo Italia S.p.A. — July 2013
 White House Black Market — October 2013
 Tumi — November 2013
 The Cheesecake Factory — November 2017

According to the International Council of Shopping Centers, more than 30 American retailers contacted mall management, wanting to open their first Canadian stores in Yorkdale after Crate & Barrel revealed that their first store outside the United States would open in Yorkdale in 2008.

Yorkdale's Nordstrom was the fourth location in Canada, opening after the locations at the Toronto Eaton Centre, Calgary's Chinook Centre and Ottawa's Rideau Centre. In 2023 Nordstrom announced their exit from Canadian market and will result in the closure of their Yorkdale location. Yorkdale's Uniqlo store was the second of its kind in Canada when it opened in late 2016, a month after the first Uniqlo opened at the Toronto Eaton Centre the previous September. Yorkdale's Lego Store is the second one in Canada after the first opened at Fairview Mall.

See also

 List of shopping malls in Canada
 List of shopping malls in Toronto
 List of largest shopping malls in Canada

References

External links

 

Eaton's
North York
Oxford Properties
Shopping malls established in 1964
Shopping malls in Toronto
1964 establishments in Ontario